Joaquim Rufino do Rêgo (January 14, 1926 – August 10, 2013) was a Roman Catholic bishop.

Ordained in 1952, Rufino do Rêgo was named bishop in 1971 and in 1986 became bishop of the Diocese of Parnaiba, Brazil. He retired in 2001.

Notes

1926 births
2013 deaths
20th-century Roman Catholic bishops in Brazil
Roman Catholic bishops of Parnaíba
Roman Catholic bishops of Quixadá